McAllister is a surname from Ireland and Scotland that originates from the Gaelic name Mac Alasdair, meaning son of Alasdair.  Alasdair is the Gaelic form of the first name Alexander.

McAllister history 
The McAllisters for the greater part owe their ancestry to the Scottish Clan Donald. The name is derived from the personal name Alexander. The McAllisters arrived in Ulster as Gallowglasses (from Irish: Gallóglaigh meaning foreign warriors) at the invitation of the MacDonnell's. Today, the greatest numbers of the name are to be found in Counties Antrim, Down,  Londonderry, Fermanagh, and Dublin, otherwise the name is widely dispersed.

Arrival in Ireland 
The MacAllisters spread into the north of Ireland early on; some families of this clan were established there by the 14th century. And a considerable number followed the MacDonalds of Dunyvaig to Antrim after that clan lost its Scottish lands in the 1600s.

Like the MacDonalds, The MacAllister's were seen as 'uncivilised Gaels' and were not considered appropriate candidates for the Ulster Plantations therefore, are not among the group now known as Ulster-Scots (or Scotch-Irish).

Common spellings 

The McAllister surname has many different spellings due to immigration.  Some of the common spellings are
McAlister
McAllister
McCallister
McCalister
McAlaster
McAlester
McAlister
McAllaster
McAllester
It is agreed upon that all bearers of the 'McAllister' surname and its derivatives share a common ancestor, which historians believe to be Somerled.

McAllister demographics 

 
'Sample size: 1,530 (1901). It is likely that these figures have changed significantly. In recent times, the religious adherence of those bearing the McAllister last name is predominantly Catholic in Ireland.'

List of persons with the surname
Alastair McAllister (born 1942), Australian harpsichord builder
Alex W. McAllister, American politician; mayor of Huntsville, Alabama
Anna McAllister (b. 1888), American historian of Catholic women's history
Anne McAllister, American writer of romance novels
Ashley McAllister, (1960-) Men among men, westcoast rugby, Truck driver known throughout the Sth island NZ, warrior.
Billy McAllister (1907–84), Australian boxer of the 1920s and '30s
 The Mac Allister family of Argentine footballers:
 Carlos Mac Allister (born 1968), also a politician
 Francis Mac Allister (born 1995), oldest son
 Kevin Mac Allister (born 1997), middle son
 Alexis Mac Allister (born 1998), youngest son
Colin McAllister (born 1968), Scottish interior designer
Craig McAllister (born 1980), Scottish footballer
David McAllister (born 1971), German politician
Deuce McAllister (born 1978), American football player
Gary McAllister (born 1964), Scottish international footballer, manager
Ian McAllister (born 1950), Irish-British-Australian professor of political science, Australian National University
Jamie McAllister (born 1978), Scottish international footballer
Jenn McAllister (born 1996), American YouTube personality
Jim McAllister (1944–2013), Irish activist and politician
John D. T. McAllister (1827–1910), Utah Pioneer and Mormon Leader
Kevin McAllister (born 1962), Scottish footballer
Mary E. McAllister, North Carolina state Representative
Matthew McAllister (1758–1823), American lawyer and politician
Matthew Hall McAllister (1800–1865), American judge
Nuala McAllister, Northern Irish politician
Randy McAllister, American blues and Americana musician
Rita McAllister, Scottish musicologist
Rod McAllister (born 1961), British architect
Rory McAllister (born 1987), Scottish footballer
Sam J. McAllister (1904–1975), American college sports coach
Samuel McAllister, American Medal of Honor recipient
Sean McAllister (born 1987), English footballer
Sean McAllister (born 1965), British documentary filmmaker
Sport McAllister (1874–1962), American baseball player
Sue McAllister, British Director General
Tim McAllister (born 1962), American musician
Vance McAllister (born 1974), member of the United States House of Representatives from Louisiana, 2013–15
Ward McAllister (1827–1895), American socialite
Ward McAllister Jr. (1855–1908), American lawyer and judge
William K. McAllister (1818–85), American jurist

List of fictional characters with the surname
Angharad McAllister from the soap opera Emmerdale
Jessica McAllister from the soap opera Emmerdale
John Peter McAllister, Korean War Veteran and ninja master, from the NBC show, The Master (American TV series)
Kevin McCallister from the film series Home Alone
C. W. McAllister, a one-time character of The Simpsons (in the King of the Hill episode)
Sergeant Thomas McAllister from the TV series Strike Back (series 6–8)
Sheriff Thomas McAllister from the TV series The Mentalist who turned out to be the serial killer Red John
Darryl McAllister from the book series Young Wizards
Jack McAllister from the TV Series Waterloo Road (TV series)

See also
Clan MacAlister
McAlister, surname
McCalister, surname
McCallister, surname
McAlester (disambiguation), includes a list of people with surname McAlester

References

External links
Clan Mc Alister of America